Aqcheh Aqashli (also Romanized as Āqcheh Āqāshlī, Āqcheh Āghāshlī, and Āqcheh Āghāchlī) is a village in Golidagh Rural District, Golidagh District, Maraveh Tappeh County, Golestan Province, Iran. At the 2006 census, its population was 418, in 86 families.

References 

Populated places in Maraveh Tappeh County